Shenzhen Energy Mansion is a  tall skyscraper between the corner of the Jintian Road and the Binhe Boulevard, in Shenzhen, Guangdong, China. Both of the building is complete in 2017 and became the headquarters of Shenzhen Energy Group and a landmark in  Futian CBD.

The towers are connected by a multi-storey bridge.

See also

Ping An Finance Center
Ping An Finance Center South
List of tallest buildings in Shenzhen

References

Skyscraper office buildings in Shenzhen
Skyscrapers in Shenzhen